Otto Männel (27 June 1887 – 11 June 1964) was a German cyclist. He competed in two events at the 1912 Summer Olympics.

References

External links
 

1887 births
1964 deaths
German male cyclists
Olympic cyclists of Germany
Cyclists at the 1912 Summer Olympics
People from Saale-Orla-Kreis
Cyclists from Thuringia
20th-century German people